Events from the year 1954 in the United States.

Incumbents

Federal Government 
 President: Dwight D. Eisenhower (R-Kansas/New York)
 Vice President: Richard Nixon (R-California)
 Chief Justice: Earl Warren (California)
 Speaker of the House of Representatives: Joseph William Martin, Jr. (R-Massachusetts)
 Senate Majority Leader: William F. Knowland (R-California)
 Congress: 83rd

Events

January

 January 14 – Marilyn Monroe marries baseball player Joe DiMaggio at San Francisco City Hall.
 January 20 
The U.S.-based National Negro Network is established with 40 charter member radio stations.
 January 21 – The first nuclear-powered submarine, the USS Nautilus, is launched in Groton, Connecticut, by First Lady of the United States Mamie Eisenhower.
 January 25 – The foreign ministers of the United States, United Kingdom, France and the Soviet Union meet at the Berlin Conference.

February
 February 2 – New York City Ballet co-founder and balletmaster George Balanchine's production of The Nutcracker is staged for the first time in New York, becoming an annual tradition there, still being performed there as of 2022.
 February 10 – After authorizing $385,000,000 over the $400,000,000 already budgeted for military aid to Vietnam, U.S. President Dwight Eisenhower warns against United States intervention in Vietnam.
 February 23 – The first mass vaccination of children against polio begins in Pittsburgh, Pennsylvania.

March
 March 1
 U.S. officials announce that a hydrogen bomb test has been conducted on Bikini Atoll in the Pacific Ocean.
 U.S. Capitol shooting incident: Four Puerto Rican nationalists open fire in the United States House of Representatives chamber and wound five people; they are apprehended by security guards.
 March 9 – Journalists Edward Murrow and Fred W. Friendly produce a 30-minute See It Now documentary, entitled A Report on Senator Joseph McCarthy.
 March 16 – The Army–McCarthy hearings are convened.
 March 19 – Joey Giardello knocks out Willie Tory at Madison Square Garden, in the first televised boxing prizefight to be shown in color.
 March 25 – The 26th Academy Awards ceremony is simultaneously held at RKO Pantages Theatre in Hollywood (hosted by Donald O'Connor) and at NBC Century Theatre (hosted by Fredric March). Fred Zinnemann's From Here to Eternity wins and receives the most respective awards and nominations, with eight (matching Gone with the Wind'''s record) and thirteen, including Best Motion Picture and Best Director for Zinnemann.
 March 28 – Puerto Rico's first television station, WKAQ-TV, goes on the air.

April
 April 1 – President Dwight D. Eisenhower authorizes the creation of the United States Air Force Academy in Colorado.
 April 7 – Dwight D. Eisenhower gives his "domino theory" speech during a news conference.
 April 16 – Vice President Richard Nixon announces that the United States may be "putting our own boys in Indochina regardless of Allied support."
 April 22 – Senator Joseph McCarthy begins hearings investigating the United States Army for being "soft" on Communism.

May
 May 14 – The Boeing 707 is released after about two years of development.
 May 16 – National Educational Television is launched on cable TV. It will become PBS on October 5, 1970.
 May 17 – Brown v. Board of Education (347 US 483 1954): The United States Supreme Court rules that segregated schools are unconstitutional.

June
 June 9 – McCarthyism: Joseph Welch, special counsel for the United States Army, lashes out at Senator Joseph McCarthy, during hearings on whether Communism has infiltrated the Army, saying, 'Have you, at long last, no decency?'.
 June 14 – The words "under God" are added to the United States Pledge of Allegiance.
 June 17 – A CIA-engineered military coup occurs in Guatemala.
 June 27 – Guatemalan President Jacobo Arbenz Guzmán steps down in a CIA-sponsored military coup, triggering a bloody civil war that continues for more than thirty-five years.

July
 July 1 – The United States officially begins using the international unit of the nautical mile, equal to 6,076.11549 ft. or 1,852 meters.
 July 15 – The maiden flight of the Boeing 367-80 (or Dash 80), a prototype of the Boeing 707 series.
 July 19 – Elvis Presley's first single, "That's All Right", is released by Sun Records (recorded July 5 in Memphis, Tennessee).

August
 August 16 – The first issue of Sports Illustrated magazine is published.

September
 September 3 – The last new episode of The Lone Ranger is aired on radio, after 2,956 episodes over a period of 21 years.
 September 8 – The original Sunshine Skyway Bridge opens to traffic.
 September 11 – The Miss America Pageant is broadcast on television for the first time.
 September 16 – Lewis Strauss, chairman of the United States Atomic Energy Commission, in a speech to the National Association of Science Writers claims: "It is not too much to expect that our children will enjoy in their homes electrical energy too cheap to meter".
 September 29 – The Catch (baseball): A notable defensive play is made by New York Giants center fielder Willie Mays on a ball hit by Cleveland Indians batter Vic Wertz during Game 1 of the 1954 World Series at the Polo Grounds in Upper Manhattan.
 September 30 – The USS Nautilus, the first nuclear-powered submarine, is commissioned by the US Navy.

October
 October 2 – The New York Giants (baseball) defeat the Cleveland Indians, 4 games to 0, to win their 5th World Series Title.
 October 15 – Hurricane Hazel makes U.S. landfall; it is the only recorded Category 4 hurricane to strike as far north as North Carolina.
 October 18 – Texas Instruments announces the development of the first transistor radio.

November
 November 10 – U.S. President Dwight D. Eisenhower dedicates the USMC War Memorial (Iwo Jima memorial) in Arlington National Cemetery.
 November 12 – The main immigration port of entry in New York Harbor at Ellis Island closes.
 November 23 – The Dow Jones Industrial Average rises 3.27 points, or 0.86%, closing at an all-time high of 382.74. More significantly, this is the first time the Dow has surpassed its peak level reached just before the Wall Street Crash of 1929.
 November 30 – In Sylacauga, Alabama, a 4 kg piece of the Hodges Meteorite crashes through the roof of a house and badly bruises a napping woman, in the first documented case of an object from outer space hitting a person.

December
 December 1 – The first Hyatt Hotel, The Hyatt House Los Angeles, opens. It is the first hotel in the world built adjacent to an airport.
 December 2 
Red Scare: The U.S. Senate votes 67–22 to condemn Joseph McCarthy for "conduct that tends to bring the Senate into dishonor and disrepute."
The Sino-American Mutual Defense Treaty between the U.S. and Republic of China is signed.
 December 4 – The first branch of Burger King opens in Miami, Florida, USA.
 December 21 – The 6.5  Eureka earthquake affects the north coast of California with a maximum Mercalli intensity of VII (Very strong). Several people are injured and one killed, with $2.1 million in damage.
 December 23 – The first successful kidney transplant is performed by Joseph E. Murray, MD in Boston from one identical twin to his brother. Murray will later share the 1990 Nobel Prize in Physiology or Medicine for his "[discovery] concerning organ and cell transplantation in the treatment of human disease".

Undated
 Mongolian gerbils are brought to the U.S. by Dr. Victor Schwentker.
 The Boy Scouts of America desegregates on the basis of race.
 The TV dinner is introduced by entrepreneur Gerry Thomas.
 The Treasury of Science Fiction Classics is published.

Ongoing
 Cold War (1947–1991)
 Second Red Scare (1947–1957)

 Births 
 
 January 17 – Robert F. Kennedy, Jr., socialite and environmental activist 
 January 19 – Clifford Tabin, geneticist and academic
 January 20 – Ken Page, actor and singer
 January 23 
 Richard Finch, bass player, songwriter and producer (KC and the Sunshine Band)
 Greg Guidry,  singer, songwriter (died 2003) 
 January 29 
 Bill Evers, baseball player, coach and manager
 Terry Kinney, actor 
 February 3 – Tom Barrise, basketball coach (died 2022)
 February 7 – Joe Maddon, baseball coach and manager
 February 9 – Chris Gardner, African-American businessman, investor, stockbroker, motivational speaker, author, and philanthropist 
 February 12 – Philip Zimmermann, cryptographer 
 February 15 – Matt Groening, author, cartoonist, producer and screenwriter
 February 16 – Margaux Hemingway, fashion model and actress, sister of Mariel Hemingway (d. 1996)
 February 18 – John Travolta, actor and singer
 February 20 – Patty Hearst, heiress and kidnap victim
 February 22 – Nathan Phillips, Native American activist

 April–June 
 April 1 – Jeff Porcaro, drummer and songwriter (Toto'') (d. 1992)
 April 3 – Chuck Deardorf, musician (d. 2022)
 April 10 – Peter MacNicol, actor
 April 23 – Michael Moore, filmmaker, writer, social critic and activist
 May 1 – Alan Poul, screen producer and director
 May 4 – Doug Jones, U.S. Senator from Alabama from 2018 to 2021
 May 8
 Pam Arciero, puppeteer and voice actress
 David Keith, actor and director
 John Michael Talbot, Christian musician
 May 10 – Mike Hagerty, actor  (d. 2022)
 May 11 –  John Clayton, sportswriter (d. 2022)
 May 12 – Rafael Yglesias, novelist and screenwriter
 May 21 – Janice Karman, film producer, record producer, singer and voice artist, wife of Ross Bagdasarian Jr.
 May 23 – Marvelous Marvin Hagler, middleweight boxer (d. 2021)
 May 26 – Danny Rolling, murderer (d. 2006)
 May 28 – Townsend Coleman, voice actor
 May 29 – Jerry Moran, U.S. Senator from Kansas from 2011
 June 8 – Greg Ginn, punk rock guitarist, singer, and songwriter (Black Flag)
 June 14 – Cyrus Vance Jr., New York County District Attorney from 2010
 June 25 – Sonia Sotomayor, Associate Justice of the Supreme Court of the U.S. from 2009

July–September 
 July 1 – Keith Whitley, country music singer (d. 1989)
 July 3 – Pennie Lane Trumbull, socialite
 July 15 – Jeff Jarvis, journalist and blogger
 July 16 – Jeanette Mott Oxford, politician
 July 23 – Janet Cooke, disgraced journalist, forced to return a Pulitzer Prize for a fabricated story
 July 25 – Walter Payton, football running back playing for the Chicago Bears (d. 1999)
 August 1 – Philip Trenary, businessman (d. 2018)
 August 19 – Lin Brehmer, disc jockey and radio personality (d. 2023)
 August 20 – Al Roker, meteorologist and television personality
 August 24 – Ed Buck, Democrat political activist and fundraiser
 September 6 – Carly Fiorina, businesswoman, CEO of Hewlett-Packard
 September 8 – Raymond T. Odierno, army general (d. 2021)
 September 21 – Cass Sunstein, legal scholar
 September 23 – Melanie Skillman, archer
 September 24 – Ash Carter, 25th United States Secretary of Defense

October–December 
 October 3 – Joe Gates, baseball player and coach (d. 2010)
 October 9 –  John O'Hurley,  actor, comedian, author, game show host and television personality
 October 26 – Stephen L. Carter, African American author of legal thrillers
 November 12 – Rob Lytle, American football player (d. 2010)
 November 14 
Anson Funderburgh, guitarist and bandleader
Condoleezza Rice, first female African American Secretary of State, in office from 2005 to 2009
 December 1 – Bob Goen, television personality and game show host
 December 2 – Stone Phillips, journalist and educator
 December 10 – Gavin Smith, film studio executive (d. 2012)
 December 11 – Jermaine Jackson, member of the Jacksons
 December 15 – Mark Warner, U.S. Senator from Virginia from 2009
 December 18 – Ray Liotta, American actor and producer (d. 2022)
 December 24 – Karla Burns, opera singer (d. 2021)
 December 28 – Gayle King, television journalist
 December 29 – Alan Myers, new wave rock drummer (Devo) (d. 2013)

Deaths

January–March 
 January 1 – Leonard Bacon, poet (b. 1887)
 January 6 – Rabbit Maranville, baseball player (b. 1891)
 January 12
 William H. P. Blandy, admiral (b. 1890)
 Elmer H. Geran, politician (b. 1875)
 January 17 – Leonard Eugene Dickson, mathematician (b. 1874)
 January 30 – John Murray Anderson, Canadian-born American actor, dancer, theatre director (b. 1886)
 January 31
 Edwin Armstrong, electrical engineer (b. 1890)
 Florence Bates, character actress (b. 1888)
 February 6 – Maxwell Bodenheim, poet and novelist (murdered) (b. 1892)
 February 8 – Laurence Trimble, silent film director and actor (b. 1885)
 February 9 – Mabel Paige, actress (b. 1880)
 February 16 –Senda Berenson Abbott, basketball pioneer (b. 1868)
 February 21 – William K. Howard, film director (b. 1899)
 March 5 – Zella de Milhau, artist, ambulance driver, community organizer and motorcycle policewoman (b. 1870)
 March 7 – Will H. Hays, politician and first chairman of the Motion Picture Producers and Distributors of America (b. 1879)
 March 26 – Louis Silvers, film composer (b. 1889)
 March 30 – Horatio Dresser, New Thought religious leader (b. 1866)

April–June 
 April 2 
 Hoyt Vandenberg, U.S. Air Force general (b. 1899)
 Maud Barger-Wallach, tennis player (b. 1870)
 April 8 – Fritzi Scheff, singer and actress (b. 1879 in Austria)
April 19 – Russell Davenport, journalist and publisher (b. 1899)
 April 21 – Emil Post, mathematician and logician (b. 1897)
 April 29 – Joe May, film director (b. 1880 in Austria)
 May 1 – Tom Tyler, film actor (b. 1903)
May 3 – Earnest Hooton, writer on anthropology (b. 1887) 
 May 15 – William March, fiction writer and marine (b. 1893)
 May 19 – Charles Ives, composer (b. 1874)
 May 22 – Chief Bender, Native American baseball player (Philadelphia Athletics) (b. 1884)
 May 25 – Robert Capa, photojournalist (killed on location in Vietnam) (b. 1913 in Hungary)
 June 9 – Alain LeRoy Locke, African American cultural leader (b. 1885)
 June 21 – Harvey A. Carr, psychologist (b. 1873)
 June 22 – Don Hollenbeck, newscaster (b. 1905)

July–September 
 July 3 – Reginald Marsh, painter (b. 1898)
 July 13
 Irving Pichel, actor and director (b. 1891)
 Grantland Rice, sportswriter (b. 1880)
 July 14 – Jackie Saunders, silent screen actress (b. 1892)
 July 17 – Machine Gun Kelly, gangster (b. 1895)
 August 3 – Bess Streeter Aldrich, novelist (b. 1881)
 August 17 – Billy Murray, singer (b. 1877)
 August 31 – Elsa Barker, writer (b. 1869)
 September 1 – Bert Acosta, aviator (b. 1895)
 September 3 – Eugene Pallette, film actor (b. 1889)
 September 6 – Edward C. Kalbfus, admiral (b. 1877)
 September 7
 Bud Fisher, cartoonist (b. 1885)
 Glenn Scobey Warner, college football coach (b. 1871)
 September 20 – Washington Phillips, gospel singer and instrumentalist (b. 1880)
 September 26 – Ellen Roosevelt, tennis player (b. 1868)
 September 28
 Bert Lytell, actor (b. 1885)
 Pat McCarran, Democratic U.S. Senator from Nevada from 1933 to 1954 (b. 1876)

October–December 
 October 3 – Herbert Prior, actor (b. 1867)
 October 9 – Robert H. Jackson, U.S. Supreme Court associate justice, chief prosecutor at the Nuremberg Trials (b. 1892)
 October 12 – George Welch, aviator (b. 1918)
 October 19 – Hugh Duffy, baseball player (Boston Braves) (b. 1866)
 October 30 – Wilbur Shaw, racing driver (b. 1902)
 November 15 – Lionel Barrymore, actor (b. 1878)
 November 16 – Albert Francis Blakeslee, botanist (b. 1874)
 November 20 – Clyde Cessna, aviator and aircraft designer and manufacturer (b. 1879)
 November 22
 Jess McMahon, professional boxing and wrestling promoter (b. 1882)
 Moroni Olsen, actor (b. 1889)
 November 29
 Enrico Fermi, nuclear physicist (b. 1901 in Italy) 
 Dink Johnson, Dixieland jazz performer (b. 1892)
 December 1 – Fred Rose, songwriter (b. 1898)
 December 8 – Gladys George, actress (b. 1904)
 December 15 – Papa Celestin, jazz bandleader, singer, cornetist, and trumpeter (b. 1884)
 December 25 
 Johnny Ace, R&B singer (shooting accident) (b. 1929) 
 Liberty Hyde Bailey, botanist (b. 1858) 
 December 27 – Adolph Otto Niedner, cartridge designer (b. 1863)

See also
 List of American films of 1954
 Timeline of United States history (1950–1969)

References

External links
 

 
1950s in the United States
United States
United States
Years of the 20th century in the United States